Ethiopia–Somaliland relations refers to the relationship between the Republic of Somaliland and the Federal Republic of Ethiopia. The two countries have no formal diplomatic relations, but Ethiopia has a consulate in Hargeisa and Somaliland has a representative office in Addis Ababa.

History

Antiquity and Early modern period
Relations between Somaliland and Ethiopia date back at least to the period of the Adal Sultanate and Abyssinia. The relationship between the two polities was often tense, culminating in the 16th century with the inconclusive Ethiopian–Adal war.

The Ethiopian Empire signed a number of treaties with the British government during the period of the British Mandate over Somaliland. The most famous of these treaties is the Anglo-Ethiopian Treaty of 1897, which was aimed at demarcating the border between Ethiopia and Somaliland. The agreement also established the freedom of trade and movement between the two sides.

Modern period
Following its establishment in 1982, the Somali National Movement decided to ally with the communist Derg regime in Ethiopia against the forces of the Somali dictator Siad Barre.
Relations between the Republic of Somaliland and Ethiopia have generally been positive since Somaliland declared independence on May 18, 1991. The state of affairs marks a departure from the historical animosity between Somalia and Ethiopia. 

In 1994, Ethiopia and Somaliland reached security and trade agreements that provided for an expanded strategic partnership. Among the most important of the agreements was a treaty providing for non-formal diplomatic relations between the two countries. Ethiopia and Somaliland also signed an extradition treaty.

See also

 Foreign relations of Somaliland
 Foreign relations of Ethiopia
 Ethiopia–Somalia relations

References

 
Ethiopia
Somaliland